Arnaud Molmy (born 7 August 1988 in Calais) is a French former professional cyclist.

Major results
2009
1st La Roue Tourangelle
2010
1st Stage 4 Étoile de Bessèges
4th Road race, National Road Championships

References

External links

1988 births
Living people
French male cyclists
Sportspeople from Calais
Cyclists from Hauts-de-France